Oncativo is a city in the province of Córdoba, Argentina. It is located near the center of the province, 76 km south-southeast from the provincial capital Córdoba City and 64 north-northwest from Villa María, by National Route 9.

Although the town had no official foundation, it is considered that it began with the arrival of the railway line and especially with the opening for public use of the train station of the Ferrocarril Central Argentino, 1 September 1869.

The area of the present-day city was the stage of the Battle of Oncativo, between the forces of generals Juan Facundo Quiroga and José María Paz, in 1830.

References

Municipality of Oncativo (official website).
Sitio de la red municipal de webs exclusiva del evento
Sitio de la red municipal de webs exclusiva del evento
Sitio de la red municipal de webs publicación periódica de gestión de gobierno
SITIO DE RADIO AMISTAD ONCATIVO - CADENA AMISTAD
SITIO FM LIBERTAD
InfOncativo (portal).
SITIO FM RADIO ONCATIVO

External links

Populated places in Córdoba Province, Argentina
Cities in Argentina
Argentina
Córdoba Province, Argentina